Ena is a genus of air-breathing land snails, terrestrial pulmonate gastropod mollusks in the family Enidae.

Species
Species within the genus Ena include:
 † Ena auversiensis (Deshayes, 1863) 
 Ena concolor (Westerlund, 1887)
 Ena coreanica Pilsbry & Y. Hirase, 1908
 Ena dazimonensis Hausdorf & Bank, 2001
 Ena elongata (Kobelt, 1877)
 † Ena hassiaca (Wenz, 1919) 
 Ena leptostraca (Schmacker & Böttger, 1891)
 Ena menkhorsti Hausdorf & Bank, 2001
 Ena montana  (Draparnaud, 1801)
 Ena monticola (J. R. Roth, 1856)
 Ena nogellii (Roth, 1850) - synonym: Buliminus ponticus Retowski, 1886
 † Ena stefanii Wenz, 1919 
 Ena subtilis (Rossmässler, 1837)
 Taxa inquirenda
 Ena batarae B. Rensch, 1930 
 Ena gaillardi Fischer-Piette & Bedoucha, 1964 
 † Ena sharmani (Baily, 1858)

References

 Studer, S. (1820). Kurzes Verzeichnis der bis jetzt in unserm Vaterlande entdeckten Conchylien. Naturwissenschaftlicher Anzeiger der Allgemeinen Schweizerischen Gesellschaft für die Gesammten Naturwissenschaften, 3 (11): 83-90; (12): 91-94. Bern [1 May; 1 June]. [reprinted as a separate work under the title: Systematisches Verzeichniss der bis jetzt bekannt gewordenen Schweizer-Conchylien. Bern 
 Bank, R. A. (2017). Classification of the Recent terrestrial Gastropoda of the World. Last update: July 16th, 2017

Enidae
Gastropod genera
Taxa named by William Turton